Dave Eastgate born 31 January 1979 is an Australian actor, stand-up comedian, writer and musician from the Gold Coast, Australia.

He starred in the ABC/BBC/Comedy Central smash hit, Ronny Chieng: International Student and received a Logie Award nomination for his portrayal of cancer patient, Joey, in Channel 9's critically acclaimed drama series, Doctor Doctor. Dave also starred alongside his comedy idols, Glenn Robbins, Magda Szubanski, Gina Riley & Jane Turner in the Comedy Channel's flag ship, sketch comedy series, Open Slather in 2015. Other acting credits include the multi-award-winning ABC comedy series, A Moody Xmas & its sequel, The Moody's, as well as Maximum Choppage, Soul Mates, and Channel 9's hugely successful comedy, Here Come The Habibs. In 2019 Dave completed over 300 shows with the inaugural Australian Tour of Muriel's Wedding the Musical and is featured on the Original Cast Album, in the principal role of Swimming Coach, Ken Blundell. 

Dave has featured in numerous commercials for companies like Westpac, Canadian Club and XXXX Gold. He currently stars in Kit Kat's worldwide, 'Katapult' campaign. Dave’s voice has been featured on countless radio commercials, ABC iView’s animated series Bin Chickens and last year as the narrator on Channel 9’s Accidental Heroes.

However; it's Dave's unique brand of stand-up comedy and rock n' roll cabaret that has brought him the most national and international acclaim, with sold-out shows at the Edinburgh Comedy Festival, tours in the UK and US and television appearances in New Zealand and Japan (in fluent Japanese). Dave has been a regular headliner in comedy clubs and festivals all over Australia since 2007 and has appeared on ABC's Tonightly, Comedy Channel's Stand-Up Australia and Just For Laughs at the Sydney Opera House. In 2016 Dave recorded his first one-hour televised comedy special, I Wish I Had A Band, at Sydney's Enmore Theatre for ABC's Comedy Next-Gen Series, which went on to air a further three times on commercial channel, 11 in 2018-19. None of that beats sharing the stage with Robin Williams at a small comedy club in Kings Cross in 2010, but that's another story.

Dave's side hustle since then has been as a TV Audience Warm-Up Guy. Beginning with the original Big Brother, in 2006. Dave has kept crowds entertained between filming on Australian Idol, So You Think You Can Dance, X Factor, The Voice, AGT and almost everything in between, including the infamously never-aired, Larry Emdur Show, pilot.

Dave’s corporate clients have included The Australia Day Council, Nestle and McDonald's, and he has also donated his talents to shows for charities such as the St Vincent DePaul Society, The Sebastian Foundation and White Ribbon.

Dave's Comedy-Heavy-Metal Album, Bad Specimen, is currently available on iTunes, Spotify and YouTube.

"...a genius to his timing – a talent not to be underestimated... " ★★★★ Three Weeks UK

"...unleashes musical thunder with a laughter-packed set of songs..." ★★★★ Metro UK

"F***ing Beautiful, man!" Academy Award Winner Robin Williams

Television
 The Moodys (2014) ... Scotty
 Maximum Choppage (2015) ... Egg
 Hiding (2015) ... Chisel
 Doctor Doctor (2016) ... Joey
 Ronny Chieng: International Student (2017) ... Mick
 Open Slather (2015) ... Various characters
 Wednesday Night Fever (2013) ... Various characters
 The Elegant Gentleman's Guide to Knife Fighting (2013) ... Various characters
 Soul Mates (2014-2016) ... Crud

References

External links

Australian male comedians
Australian male television actors
Living people
Year of birth missing (living people)